Barry Cheales  (born 7 February 1943) is an Australian gymnast. He competed in eight events at the 1964 Summer Olympics.

Cheales was awarded the Medal of the Order of Australia in the 1994 Australia Day Honours for "service to the sport of gymnastics". He received the Australian Sports Medal in 2000.

References

External links
 

1943 births
Living people
Australian male artistic gymnasts
Olympic gymnasts of Australia
Gymnasts at the 1964 Summer Olympics
Place of birth missing (living people)
Recipients of the Medal of the Order of Australia
Recipients of the Australian Sports Medal